Imre Gellért (24 July 1888 – 10 May 1981) was a Hungarian gymnast who competed in the 1908 Summer Olympics and in the 1912 Summer Olympics. In 1908 he participated in the individual all-around competition and finished 39th.

He was part of the Hungarian team, which won the silver medal in the gymnastics men's team, European system event in 1912. In the individual all-around competition he finished 17th.

See also
List of select Jewish gymnasts

References

External links
profile

1888 births
1981 deaths
Gymnasts from Budapest
Hungarian male artistic gymnasts
Jewish gymnasts
Gymnasts at the 1908 Summer Olympics
Gymnasts at the 1912 Summer Olympics
Olympic gymnasts of Hungary
Olympic silver medalists for Hungary
Olympic medalists in gymnastics
Medalists at the 1912 Summer Olympics
20th-century Hungarian people